Gao Qipei (1660–1734) was born in Jiangxi to a family of Manchu ethnicity. He had success as an official in southern China, but is best known today as a painter. 

He initially gained reputation as an artist who did landscapes and figures in traditional style. By age twenty, he became known as an eccentric who preferred using his fingers instead of a brush. This style had precedents as Zhang Zao also preferred finger painting, but Gao Qipei went further. He grew his fingernails long to make them more effective instruments, and used his entire hand to create a highly individualized style.

Sources
Chinese Paintings in the Ashmolean Museum Oxford(51) Oxford 
Rijksmuseum
Cornell Museum handbook on him

Qing dynasty painters
1660 births
1734 deaths
Painters from Jiangxi
Qing dynasty politicians from Jiangxi
Han Chinese Bordered White Bannermen
Han Chinese Bordered Yellow Bannermen